Aaganthuka is a 1987 Indian Kannada language thriller - drama film directed by Suresh Heblikar and written by A. Balakrishna. It was produced by Anubhava Films banner. Besides Heblikar, the film features Devaraj, Vanitha Vasu and Seetharam in pivotal roles. The music was composed by Rajeev Taranath.

The film won actor Devaraj Karnataka State Best Supporting Actor award for his performance.

Cast
 Suresh Heblikar
 Vanitha Vasu
 Devaraj
 Seetharam
 Aravind
 Sudheendra
 Jayashree
 Goda Ramkumar
 Veeranna Kurli
 Sundaramma

Soundtrack
The songs are composed and scored by Rajeev Taranath and lyrics written by M. N. Vyasa Rao.

References

External links 
 songspk

1987 films
1980s Kannada-language films
Indian thriller drama films
1980s thriller drama films
1987 drama films